Barroso is a Brazilian municipality located in the south of the state of Minas Gerais. The city belongs to the mesoregion of Campo das Vertentes and to the microregion of Barbacena.

Geography 
According to IBGE (2017), the municipality is in the Immediate Geographic Region of Barbacena, in the Intermediate Geographic Region of Barbacena.

Ecclesiastical circumscription 
The municipality is part of the Roman Catholic Diocese of São João del-Rei.

See also
 List of municipalities in Minas Gerais

References

Municipalities in Minas Gerais